Herman Leonard Weiss Jr. (July 22, 1916 – September 6, 1976) was an American professional basketball player. He played in the National Basketball League in just three games for the Cleveland Allmen Transfers during the 1944–45 season. After basketball he worked for General Electric for many years. In 1976 Weiss died from cancer.

References

1916 births
1976 deaths
American men's basketball players
Basketball players from Cleveland
Case Western Spartans men's basketball players
Cleveland Allmen Transfers players
Guards (basketball)